Amaranth is a common name for the plants in the genus Amaranthus.

Amaranth, Amaranthe, or Amaranthus may also refer to:

Arts and media

Music
 "Amaranth" (song), a 2007 song by Finnish symphonic metal band Nightwish
 Amaranth (album), a 2008 album by Davichi
 Amaranthe, a Swedish power metal/melodic death metal band
 Amaranthe (album), a 2011 album by the band Amaranthe
 Amaranthus (album), a 2016 album by Momoiro Clover Z

Other media
 Amaranth Games, now Aveyond Studios, developer of the Aveyond series of video games
 Amaranth, a class of immortals featured in the Jack Vance novel To Live Forever

Internet personality
Amouranth, glamour model, and internet personality

Colors 
 Amaranth (color), a bright reddish rose color
 Amaranth (dye), a dye used for coloring food (E123, FD&C Red No. 2), now banned by the US Food and Drug Administration

Organizations 
 Amaranth Advisors, a defunct American hedge fund firm
 Order of the Amaranth, a Masonic-affiliated organization

Places 
 Amaranth, Manitoba, a town in Canada
 Amaranth, Ontario, a township in Ontario, Canada
 Amaranth, Pennsylvania, a place in Pennsylvania, US
 Amarante, Portugal, a town in Northern Portugal

Plants 
 Amaranth grain, the edible grains of the amaranth genus
 Gomphrena or globe amaranth, a genus of plants in the family Amaranthaceae
 Peltogyne, a genus of tropical trees that produce lumber called "amaranth wood"

Ships
 Amaranth (barquentine), 1901 4-masted ship in the China trade
 , a list of ships that share the name
 USLHT Amaranth, schooner-rigged, twin-screw, wooden-hulled lighthouse tender that served in both World Wars
 USS Amaranthus (1864), screw steamer used by US Navy as a tugboat in the blockade of Confederate waterways

See also 
 Amouranth (born 1993), an Internet celebrity
 Amarante (disambiguation)
 Amaranthine (disambiguation)
 Amarantus of Alexandria (1st century AD), ancient Greek writer
 Amarnath (disambiguation)